Branko Cikatić (4 October 1954 – 22 March 2020) was a Croatian heavyweight kickboxer, the first Croatian-born fighter to achieve international success. He was the first K-1 World Grand Prix Champion. The tournament was held on April 30, 1993 in Japan.

Biography and career
Cikatić began his martial arts training at the age of 12 when he took up Taekwondo, and later Shotokan Karate at 16. He eventually earned a black belt in both of these disciplines, as well as a blue belt in Judo. When he was 18 years old, he took up boxing before switching to kickboxing.

He surprised the martial arts world by taking the 1993 K-1 Grand Prix tournament by storm, knocking out all three of his opponents in one evening, including Ernesto Hoost in the final match. To date Cikatić is the oldest winner of the K-1 Grand Prix at 38 years and 208 days.

He extended his athletic resume to include mixed martial arts in 1998, fighting in the Pride Fighting Championships.  His PRIDE debut was fought against Ralph White under K-1 rules format. Cikatić lost via disqualification after kicking the head of the downed White. Cikatić returned at Pride 2, fighting under MMA rules and facing Mark Kerr. He was again disqualified after holding the ring ropes when Kerr attempted a takedown, refusing to let go when directed by the referee, running away through the ring ropes, and delivering several illegal elbows to the back of Kerr's head.  His next fight at Pride 7 ended in a submission loss to Maurice Smith by forearm choke.

Towards the end of his sports career, Cikatić tried his hand at acting, playing a villain in a 1997 B-movie Skyscraper, starring Anna Nicole Smith. In 2018, Cikatić had a pulmonary embolism and whilst in hospital acquired an infection causing sepsis and was later diagnosed as suffering from Parkinson's disease. He died on 22 March 2020.

Titles
Professional Career:
1998 WMTA World Champion in Thai boxing (Zagreb)
1994 K-1 Grand Prix 3rd Place (Tokyo)
1993 K-1 World Grand Prix Champion (Tokyo)
1991 World Champion in Thai boxing 86 kg (Berlin)
1991 IKBF World Champion in kick-boxing 86 kg (Zagreb)
1991 WKA World Champion in kick-boxing 86 kg (Wiesbaden)
1989 WMTA World champion in Thai boxing 86 kg (Düsseldorf)
1987 WMTA World champion in Thai boxing 82.5 kg (Amsterdam)
1986 European champion in Thai boxing (Paris)
1985 European champion in Thai boxing (Amsterdam)

Amateur Career:
1983 European Championships in Caen  (Full-Contact)
1982 European Championships in Berlin  (Full-Contact)
1981 W.A.K.O. European Championships in Dublin  -79 kg (Full-Contact)
1981 W.K.K.A. World Championships in Miami  79 kg (Full-Contact)
1980 W.A.K.O. European Championships in London  -79 kg (Full-Contact)
1979 W.A.K.O. European Championships in Milan  -79 kg (Full-Contact)

Fight record (Incomplete)

Mixed martial arts record

|-
| Loss
| align=center| 0–2
| Maurice Smith
| Submission (forearm choke)
| Pride 7
| 
| align=center| 1
| align=center| 7:33
|
|
|-
| Loss
| align=center| 0–1
| Mark Kerr
| DQ (grabbing the ropes)
| Pride 2
| 
| align=center| 1
| align=center| 2:14
|
|

See also
List of K-1 events
List of K-1 champions
List of male kickboxers

References

External links

Branko Cikatic Official Homepage

Profile at K-1

1954 births
2020 deaths
Croatian male kickboxers
Cruiserweight kickboxers
Heavyweight kickboxers
Croatian male judoka
Croatian male karateka
Croatian Muay Thai practitioners
Croatian male taekwondo practitioners
Croatian male mixed martial artists
Mixed martial artists utilizing Shotokan
Mixed martial artists utilizing taekwondo
Mixed martial artists utilizing judo
Mixed martial artists utilizing Muay Thai
Sportspeople from Split, Croatia
Croatian expatriate sportspeople in the Netherlands